The Wartime Information Board was a Canadian government agency established on 9 September 1942, succeeding the Bureau of Public Information, to coordinate the existing public information service of the government, supervise the release from government sources of Canadian war news and information, and facilitate distribution of Canadian war information both internally and externally.

When the Second World War began, Canada did not have a centralized information service to deal with information dissemination. On 8 December 1939, the Bureau of Public Information was created. Initially it had worked with the Chief Censor and was later attached to the Department of National War Services. Its initial function was to coordinate and supply information produced by its own staff and by other departments, including Department of National Defence and Department of Munitions and Supply. However issues with dissemination led to a report that resulted in the creation of the Wartime Information Board. 

Chairmen of the Board included Thomas Vinning and Norman A.M. Mackenzie. However, the real power on the board was held by its general manager who included John Grierson and A. Davidson Dunton. Thomas Vinning was replaced by John Grierson, the Commissioner of the National Film Board, as General Manager of the Wartime Information Board. By taking the reins of the graphics department of the Wartime Information Board he was able to extend the use of a documentary style to the photographs, posters and publications put out by the government.

The Wartime Information Board’s duty was to create a common outlook amongst Canadians on their identity and perception on the war. The material created by this agency served to inform on the war and encourage wartime participation. The focus was to ensure high morale and patriotic fervour: "sharing together in common experience, working and striving in great causes." Over the course of the war, the Board established various foreign offices, undertook surveys and opinion polls, gave guided tours, studied Canadian news, and developed press information.

In January 1943, all photographic operations came under the jurisdiction of the National Film Board. It produced more graphic material needed by the government for the war effort, and funds from the Wartime Information Board served to support the making and distribution of films.

Throughout the war, the Wartime Information Board released a monthly account of the war effort in the form of a publication called “Canada at War”. The publication covered a wide range of topics, from wartime industry, women at war, etc. The publication was distributed throughout Canada to various audiences from farmers to housewives.

The board was an early developer of public opinion polling techniques in Canada.

At the end of the war, The Wartime Information Board released a series of pamphlets, as a supplement to informing Canadians about post-war reconstruction and urging discussions of "the most positive approach to some of the outstanding problems of Canada's future."

Posters created by the board

General references 
 Gary Evans, John Grierson and the National Film Board: The politics of Wartime Propaganda. Toronto: University of Toronto Press, 1984.
 Wartime Information Board, Canada at War, 1941-1945.

References

1942 establishments in Canada
Former Canadian federal departments and agencies
Canada in World War II
Propaganda organizations
News agencies based in Canada
National Film Board of Canada